Shadow Peak is located in the Teton Range, within Grand Teton National Park, U.S. state of Wyoming. Shadow Peak is just southeast of Nez Perce Peak and rises to the north above Avalanche Canyon.

References

Mountains of Grand Teton National Park
Mountains of Wyoming
Mountains of Teton County, Wyoming